Madonna and Child is a series of sculptures by Charles Umlauf. Versions are found in the collections of the Umlauf Sculpture Garden and Museum (Austin, Texas) and the Dallas Museum of Art. One limestone sculpture is installed outside the Lois Perkins Chapel on the Southwestern University campus in Georgetown, Texas. The artwork was installed on September 1, 1953, as a gift to the university from alumnae Margarett Root Brown in memory of her mother.

See also

 Monstrance for a Grey Horse, another artwork installed at Southwestern University

References

1953 establishments in Texas
1953 sculptures
Georgetown, Texas
Limestone sculptures in the United States
Outdoor sculptures in Texas
Sculptures of children in the United States
Sculptures of women in Texas
Southwestern University